Wardell House may refer to:

in the United States
(by state)
Wardell House (Macon, Missouri), listed on the National Register of Historic Places in Macon County, Missouri
Wardell House (Shrewsbury, New Jersey), listed on the National Register of Historic Places in Monmouth County, New Jersey

See also
The Wardell, Detroit, Michigan, listed on the NRHP in Detroit, Michigan